is a furniture and product designer. He was born in 1942, in Osaka, Japan. Professor at the Osaka University of Arts.  His earliest pieces, the Wink Chair and the Kick Table are currently in the permanent collections of the New York City Museum of Modern Art and  Hamburg, Germany's Museum fur Kunst und Gewerbe.

He has served as a governmental advisor to Singapore, Thailand, and China for their country's revitalization of its design resource. Very active in revitalizing and promoting local Japanese traditional crafts and industries. Producer of the international trade fair for home and lifestyle renovation “Living & Design” and proponent of Japanese lifestyle renovation, the “RENOVETTA” project. In 2015, his invitational exhibition “Il Lusso Della Natura” was held at Chiesa San Domenico Church in Alba, Italy.

He received multiple international awards include the 1990 “Delta de Oro (Gold Prize)” Award of Spain, and the ADI prize “carrier Internazionale of Compasso d'Oro” of Italy in 2011.

He was bestowed with the honorary title of Commendatore by the Italian Republic, in 2017.

His recent publications include "Power of Design" (Nikkei Publishing Inc., 2007), "Local Industry + Design" (Gakugei Shuppan-Sha, 2009), "Venture for Design 1969 - Why I Went to Italy to Design" (Gakugei Shuppan-Sha, 2012), and many more. His DVD “Made with Heart and Soul”, 20 minutes documentary on Kita's 40 years of collaboration with various local Japanese traditional arts and craftsmanship was awarded the Gold Prize of World Media Festival 2012 (Public Relations/Culture) at Hamburg, Germany, in 2012.

References

External links 
Official site of Toshiyuki Kita

Living people
1942 births
People from Osaka
Osaka University of Arts alumni
Japanese industrial designers